Guo Xusheng (born April 1965) is a Chinese geologist specializing in oil-gas exploration. He is an academician of the Chinese Academy of Engineering (CAE) and serves as general manager of the Sinopec Exploration Company.

Biography
Guo was born in Chiping District of Liaocheng, Shandong, in April 1965. He holds a bachelor's degree and a master's degree from Shandong Normal University. After graduating in 1988, he assumed various posts in the Shengli Oilfield Geological Research Institute, including assistant, engineer, and senior engineer. He joined the Sinopec Exploration Company in June 2000, becoming its general manager in December 2007.

Honours and awards
 January 2014 Li Siguang Geological Science Award
 2016 Science and Technology Progress Award of the Ho Leung Ho Lee Foundation 
 November 22, 2019 Member of the Chinese Academy of Engineering (CAE)

References

External links
Guo Xusheng on the Chinese Academy of Sciences (CAS)  

1965 births
Living people
People from Liaocheng
Engineers from Shandong
Shandong Normal University alumni
Chinese geologists
Members of the Chinese Academy of Engineering